Mansart may refer to:

François Mansart (1598–1666), French architect
Jules Hardouin-Mansart (1646–1708), French architect, his grandnephew
 Mansart (crater), a crater on Mercury

See also 
Mansard roof